Perihan is a Turkish female name from Persian origin. Perihan is combined of two Persian words: peri, which literally means fairy and generally refers to a beautiful young woman, and han, which means queen in old Persian.

Perihan may refer to:

 Perihan Benli (born 1942), best known as "Romalı Perihan", Turkish soprano, socialite, painter, model, columnist, and actress
 Perihan Mağden (born 1960), Turkish writer
 Perihan Topaloğlu (born 1987), Turkish handballer

Turkish given names